Nakhon Chedi is a village and tambon (subdistrict) of Pa Sang District, in Lamphun Province, Thailand. In 2005 it had a population of 8596 people. The tambon contains 12  villages.

References

Tambon of Lamphun province
Populated places in Lamphun province